TFAE may refer to:

Mathematics
 TFAE: "The Following Are Equivalent"

Chemistry
 Pirkle's alcohol, or TFAE: 2,2,2-trifluoro-1-(9-anthryl)ethanol